K'Nex  is a construction toy system founded by Joel Glickman. It was first introduced in America in 1992. K'Nex is designed and produced by K'Nex Industries Inc. of Hatfield, Pennsylvania. 
K'Nex was purchased by Florida-based company Basic Fun! in 2018.

The toy's building system consists of interlocking plastic rods, connectors, blocks, gears, wheels, and other components, which can be assembled to form a wide variety of models, machines, and architectural structures. While K'Nex is designed for children ages 5-12, a larger version, Kid K'Nex, is aimed towards children 5 and younger.

The toy has been released and marketed in various stores, as well as online websites. K'Nex has released various sets, educational kits, and models consisting of assorted parts, the last of which includes parts and instructions specifically packaged to be assembled into a specific model.

History

The concept behind K'Nex was originally conceived by Joel Glickman while attending a wedding. There, he started thinking of what he could do with his straw if he could connect it to other straws. He and his brother Bob Glickman discussed the idea and started the K'Nex company. The original building system kept very closely to the idea that Joel Glickman had: basic rods and connectors which could be easily attached together to make various constructions. Other parts such as wheels and pulleys are also included to allow more flexibility in construction. The first K'Nex Box was launched in the U.S. market in 1993. Original models with moving parts had a handcrank to make things move, but soon, gears and motors allowed models to move on their own. 

K'Nex made contacts at the four largest toy companies at the time: Hasbro, Mattel, Lego, and Tyco Toys, and all four turned K'Nex down. As a result of that, Joel Glickman made contacts that ultimately led to toy retailing giant Toys "R" Us, and the purchasing people there encouraged Joel to produce and sell K'Nex directly. The first shipment of K'Nex was made to Toys "R" Us in early October 1992.

Until 2001, K'Nex did not make sets containing licensed brands (as Lego had with Harry Potter, Star Wars, etc.), but often based its sets around popular fads (such as mech warriors and RC cars). In 2001, K'Nex broke from this trend and introduced a line of toys using the BattleTech/MechWarrior label, and later launched the OCC (Orange County Chopper) line of toys in 2006 and a line of Sesame Street building sets in 2008. 
In 2010, K'Nex released a brand of sets based on the monster truck live tour Monster Jam. Trucks released were Grave Digger, Maximum Destruction, Monster Mutt, Blue Thunder, Avenger, El Toro Loco, Grave Digger the Legend, Son-Uva Digger, Advance Auto Parts Grinder, Monster Mutt Dalmatian, Air Force Afterburner, Mohawk Warrior and Captain's Curse (who was never released in the standard size). The trucks would be released in standard or mini size, and featured working suspension. Standard size trucks included a driver figure (most of which were cartoonish representations of actual drivers), and they would occasionally come in doubles. Mini sized trucks would come paired with another truck. The triangular boxes they came in could also be used as a ramp for the truck. The line was discontinued in 2013. In 2011, K'Nex released a brand of Mario Kart Wii building sets with buildable karts and tracks as well as items and enemies from the series like Bullet Bills, Chain Chomps, Goombas, and many others. This set came with Mario, Luigi, Bowser, and Yoshi as the racers. Other licensed products that K'Nex has issued in recent years include Lincoln Logs, Tinkertoy, Angry Birds, KISS, The Beatles, Family Guy, and Monster Jam.

By 2011, K'Nex was distributed in over 25 countries, including the United States.

In 2018, all of K'Nex's assets were purchased by Basic Fun!, a Florida-based toy company. The acquisition was valued at around $21 million.

Pieces

The basic K'Nex pieces used to make models include rods, connectors, and bricks. Basic K'Nex pieces are made out of polyoxymethylene plastic.
K'Nex rods come in a range of lengths. The shortest rod length allows connectors to be immediately adjacent. This simplifies the construction of right-angle isosceles triangles, and these triangles provide structural strength in models. Most types of K'Nex rods are only slightly flexible, but there are extra rigid and very flexible versions of some of the longer rods.
K'Nex connectors also come in a range of types, each having a different number of slots. They can link the rods together in different ways. The first way is to insert the end of a rod into a slot on the connector, where it snaps firmly into place. Rods connect at angles which are multiples of 45 degrees. The second method is to snap the rod into one of the connector slots perpendicular to first method. The rods cannot rotate and will not move without deliberate force. The third way is to slip the rod through a round hole in the connector. The rod can slide and rotate freely while in the hole.
K'Nex bricks were added to K'Nex sets in 2008 as part of the 15th anniversary of the brand. Consisting of post-and-stud connecting blocks and plates similar to Lego and other compatible brands, K'Nex blocks also have holes between the studs where K'Nex rods can be inserted.

There are several other K'Nex pieces, such as wheels, pulleys, and other simple machines. There are also various motors that can make the models move.

Use

K'Nex can be used to construct innumerable creations because many different pieces can interlock at different angles and directions. From miniature cows to complete table sets to roller coasters, many objects and contraptions in various sizes can be constructed. Because K'Nex pieces are made of a strong plastic and interlock, these constructs are usually quite sturdy.
Many hobbyists have included low-power servo motors and wheels other than K'Nex in their constructions. Even real bikes (complete with bicycle wheels) have been constructed with K'Nex.

Educational products
While all K'Nex building sets are educational, the company also carries a line of products that are targeted for use in the classroom. This includes building sets for creating DNA models, simple machines and geometry tools, among many other items. These sets are presumably designed for preschool to high school-aged students.

Display models and exhibits
Concordia University's Engineering and Computer Science Association (ECA) has erected models of a Space Shuttle, the Sears Tower, the Eiffel Tower, Habitat 67, and mazes out of K'Nex. The U.S. Space and Rocket Center held a Guinness Book of World Records Award for the "World's Largest K'Nex Sculpture" and also has a huge space shuttle and rocket in their gift shop in Huntsville, Alabama. The Guinness World Record for "World's Largest K'Nex Sculpture" was broken in 2014 by a team in the UK with a 13.38-meter long K'Nex replica of the BLOODHOUND 1600 km\h Supersonic Car. K'Nex also has a traveling exhibit, K'Nex: Build Thrill Rides, that visits school and museums across the country.

Computer game
A computer game, K'NEX The Lost Mines: Adventure Begins, was released in 1998 by EAI Interactive for Windows 95.

See also
 K*bot World Championships
 Fischertechnik
 Meccano

References

External links
Official K'Nex website
Calculator made from K'Nex
K'Nex Roller Coasters

Construction toys
Products introduced in 1992
Toy companies of the United States